Zaïko Langa Langa is a Congolese soukous band formed in Kinshasa, in 1969. It was established by D.V. Moanda, Henri Mongombe, Marcellin Delo and André Bita, the band evolved from the Orchestre Bel Guide National, which is seen as Zaïko's predecessor. Co-founders included Papa Wemba, Jossart N'Yoka Longo, Manuaku Waku.

Led by N'Yoka Longo, they are seen as the most influential African group and have participated in the evolution and innovation of the main musical genre in Congo, the Congolese rumba.

Due to several splits of the group, the Langa Langa clan was born, bringing together all the dissidents of the great Zaïko (including Viva La Musica, Isifi Lokole, Choc Stars, Langa Langa Stars, Quartier Latin).

History

1968–1970: Formation

From Bel Guide National to Zaïko Langa Langa 
A band of young musicians called Bel Guide National had been active since 1967. This orchestra included N'Yoka Longo, Manuaku Waku, Enoch Zamuangana, Teddy Sukami and Gégé Mangaya as musicians, and also D.V. Moanda as administrator. A year later, on December 23, 1969, a young man named Jules Shungu Wembadio (whose artistic name was Jules Presley), a friend of the Mangaya cousins, approached a rehearsal of Bel Guide and sang accompanied by Manuaku on guitar. Moanda, impressed by Jules' performance, then decided to dissolve Bel Guide to form a new group by keeping Wemba and some members of the team.

On the next day, December 24, around 3:00 p.m, a meeting took place in the home of the Mangaya family, in 10 Avenue Popo Kabaka, where D.V. Moanda, Henri Mongombe, Marcellin Delo and André Bita formed Zaïko Langa Langa, with Jules Shungu, Manuaku Waku, Jossart N’Yoka and Teddy Sukami as co-founders. On the following days, several musicians joined the band, including Matima Mpiosso, Siméon Mavuela and  Evoloko Jocker.

On March 24, 1970, the Orchestre Zaïko Langa Langa played their first concert in the Bar Dancing Hawai, and later in the same year, they recorded songs for Polydor Records and other Congolese labels and released the single "Mosinzo Nganga / Pauline". The tracks were respectively composed by Teddy Sukami and Jules Presley Shungu. Jossart also released one of his first songs "La Tout Neige" in a single.

Influenced by youngster band Los Nickelos, the musical style of the latter was highly remarkable in Zaïko's first songs.

The group was divided into two sections, typical and pop: Jules Shungu Wembadio, Jossart N’Yoka Longo, Antoine Evoloko Bitumba, Siméon Mavuela, Pierre Nkumu, Mashakado Nzolantima on vocals (the latter two from the pop section), Félix Manuaku Waku, Enoch Zamuangana, Teddy Sukami, Damien Ndebo and Zéphyrin Matima Mpioso on guitars (the latter from the pop section), Beaudoin Mitsho on drums and Ephraim on congas. Still in 1970, precisely in March, drummer Bimi Ombale joined the pop lineup of the band. At the time, the band was located in the Commune de Kasa-Vubu.

1971–1976: Rise and first tour

First line-up changes and innovations 
One of Zaïko's first innovations was the removal of the horns section in their songs, contrary to TPOK Jazz. The appearance of the band emerged the third generation of Congolese music (first generation included Wendo Kolosoy, Adou Elenga, Antoine Kasongo and others; second generation included TPOK Jazz and l'African Jazz).

Zaïko Langa Langa published more than fifty singles during 1971–74.

In 1971, Ombale was interested in singing, but not all the members wanted him to sing, which caused a dispute. Disappointed following this, he left the group to join Tabou National. However, some months later, he rejoined the orchestra. New additions to the band lineup this year were: bassist Muaka Mbeka, nicknamed Bapius, percussionist Belobi Ng'Ekerme, nicknamed Meridjo, and vocalist Efonge Isekofeta, known as Gina wa Gina. All of them joined in early 1971.

Not long after his arrival, Bapius established a style of bass playing named trombone or also kindobika that differed from the band's influences. According to himself, he was inspired by traditional Kongo music and also the dances he performed as a boy scout. Efonge also shines after his song "Consolation", published in 1972, becomes a hit. Meridjo switched from congas to drums, after Ombale's departure. The soloist of the pop section, Mbuta Matima, switched to the typical section.

At this time, Zaïko Langa Langa became one of Zaïre's top bands and Jules Presley changes his stage name to Papa Wemba.

First awards and Plaisir De L'Ouest Afrique 
Zaïko Langa Langa joined Verckys' emblematic label, les Éditions Vévé.

In 1973, during a trip from Pointe-Noire to Kinshasa by train, the members of Zaïko sang accompanied by Meridjo who had drumsticks. Evoloko proposes the idea to the latter to imitate the sound of the train with the snare drum. Belobi pioneered the idea and gave birth to the cavacha, the most widely used drum (snare and hi-hat) beat in sub-Saharan Africa. According to Oncle Bapius, "Mbeya Mbeya", composed by Evoloko in 1973, is one of the first songs to include the cavacha beat.

For the first time in its existence, Zaïko Langa Langa was awarded by the Association of Music Chroniclers of Zaire as "Best Orchestra of Zaire", still in 1973.

Evoloko Jocker emerged as arguably the band's most popular member, credited with inventing a dance craze also named cavacha, that swept East and Central Africa during the seventies.

In mid-1974, Meridjo was arrested and imprisoned in Ekafela Prison with a 21-month sentence. After this incidence, Bakunde Ilo Pablo, drummer of the group Chem Chem Yetu, joined to replace Belobi during his absence. Not long after his integration, he achieved a high level of success following the release of two of his compositions, "Ndonge" and "Ando", as singles.

In this same period, Bozi Boziana integrates the composition of the group to replace Gina Efonge, who had depression.

In September 1974, Zaïko Langa Langa took part in the Zaire 74 music festival, alongside TPOK Jazz, Tabu Ley Rochereau, Orchestre Stukas, James Brown and many other American musicians. Their performance lasted 45 minutes. In the same year, Zaïko Langa Langa's debut LP was released entitled "Non Stop Dancing", containing 6 songs, including the hits "Eluzam" and "Mbeya Mbeya".

In December 1974, the Orchestre Zaïko survived its first split. Papa Wemba, Evoloko Jocker, Bozi Boziana and Mavuela Somo left and formed Isifi Lokole. Years later, this formation also separated and gave birth to Yoka Lokole, which also separated and emerged Viva La Musica in December 1976.

They received two awards in that year: Best Orchestra of Zaire and Best Star of the Year (Evoloko Jocker).

"Mizou" was one of the first singles of the band, released in early 1975. To fill the void left by the members of Isifi Lokole, singers Likinga Redo and Lengi Lenga Nsumbu joined the group. Mbuta Mashakado changes from pop section to typical. In the second half of 1975 the singles "Eboza", "Yudasi" and "Elo" were issued. The latter was very successful when it was released, as well as the two others.

In late 1975, produced by the prominent guitarist Henri Bowane, Zaïko Langa Langa went on tour in Ghana for a month and a half, where they recorded at Studio Essiebons their second LP and first double album entitled "Plaisir De L'Ouest Afrique", remastered and later reissued in 1993 as "Zaire-Ghana". Still in 1976, Manuaku Waku joins Ray Lema, Bopol Mansiamina and many others to form an offshoot band, Les Ya Toupas du Zaïre.

After the ensemble returned to Kinshasa, Mashakado left the band to join Yoka Lokole, Gina Efonge returned after no longer having depression (although he left in 1977 to form his band T.P. Libanko) and Meridjo Belobi was released from the prison.

1977–1979: Pre-golden era

FESTAC 77 participation and tenth anniversary 
Bozi Boziana and Mbuta Mashakado have reintegrated into Zaïko, after the failure of Yoka Lokole. Manuaku Waku, N'Yoka Longo, Likinga Redo and Mashakado were selected by Tabu Ley Rochereau to join the National Orchestra of Zaire (ONAZA). They participate as band members at FESTAC 77 in Lagos.

Belobi signs his comeback in the group with the release of the single "Sangela". Upon his return, he plays alternately with Pablo. Boziana also shines with the release of his songs as singles, including "Diana Ya Mama", "Bibichana" and "Toutou". In early 1978, the group had a recording session at the RENAPEC studio. Songs recorded during the session were released as singles throughout the year, including "Pacha Labaran", "Mystère", "Likamuisi" and "Belingo" (a new version of "Ndendeli"). Mobutu's JMPR included members of Zaïko Langa Langa in a delegation to travel to Europe, which was the first time they had gone there.

Teddy Sukami created an offshoot band called Les Casques Bleus. The band lineup had included Lengi-Lenga and Yenga Yenga Junior. The latter joins the group Zaïko Langa Langa as Likinga's understudy, since they have extremely similar voices. Sukami released the song "Bongo Bouger" with this group in June 1978. The single was certified gold by SONECA.

Zaïko Langa Langa recorded N'Yoka Longo's hit "Sentiment Awa" for the first time towards the end of the year. Evoloko Jocker rejoined the band after the failure of Isifi Lokole.

In December 1979, Zaïko Langa Langa celebrated 10 years of existence. In early 1980, a concert honouring the tenth anniversary took place at the Palais du Peuple in Kinshasa.

1980–1989: Golden decade

Manuaku's departure, from Gitta Production Présente Le Tout-Choc Zaïko Langa Langa to Nkolo Mboka 
During the first trimester of 1980, Manuaku's hit "Obi" was released.

In September 1980, a mass revocation of many members, led to several disputes between Manuaku Waku and other members of the group. He left with Cheikdan Mbuku, Mbuta Sanza, Otis Mbuta and Djudjuchet Luvengoka to form Grand Zaïko Wawa. Months later, towards the end of the year, singer JP Buse, soloists Petit Poisson Avedila and Roxy Tshimpaka joined the band. They also released the hit "Fièvre Mondo", composed by Evoloko Jocker, which was awarded Best Song of the Year 1980. Apart from this song, the singles "Solomo", "Viya" and "Crois-Moi" were also issued.

The group's third LP, entitled "Gitta Production Présente Le Tout-Choc Zaïko Langa Langa", was released in 1981 containing four songs. It was recorded during an 8-song recording session in Brussels at Studio Igloo.

In September 1981, a group of musicians of the band, which included Bozi Boziana, led by Evoloko Jocker, left the band and formed Langa Langa Stars with producer Verckys. Meanwhile, Zaïko's members had altercations with Verckys. Later, the latter took back the instruments he had previously lent to the group in the middle of a concert at the Ciné Palladium, later called Cinémax. Zaïko Langa Langa was inactive for nine months without instruments and financial resources.

The four remaining songs to be released from the Studio Igloo session were released in 1982 on the band's fourth LP called "Tout-Choc".

Despite all these problems, the band's main songwriters composed several tracks to appear on the band's fifth album. In mid-1982, they managed to tour Europe and recorded the songs prepared in Kinshasa in Brussels. Their fifth LP and second double album was released in September 1982, under the title "Nkolo Mboka".

During the official presentation of the album on October 30, 1982, on the television program Variété Samedi Soir, spectators witnessed the inclusion of atalaku (also called animators) in modern Congolese music. The atalaku Nono Monzuluku and Bébé Mangituka as well as the percussionist Djerba Mandjeku Makale joined the group, coming from the traditional group Bana Odéon, based in Kintambo, where the animation originated. Over the next few decades, almost every band on the Congolese music scene introduced animators as members.

From Muvaro to Nippon Banzaï 
The group's eighth album, "Muvaro", was recorded in early 1983 at Studio I.A.D. in Brazzaville. The eponymous song, composed by Lengi Lenga, was a great success. The melodious sebene of the song was played by Beniko Zangilu Popolipo. The latter was recruited to replace Roxy Tshimpaka, who had previously left in 1981 with Evoloko and was one of the "7 patrons" of Langa Langa Stars. Popolipo also came from the offshoot.

The group's next LP entitled "Zekete Zekete 2ème Episode" was also released in 1983, precisely in the month of August. It was recorded in Paris during another European tour. This album becomes the first to have animateurs. The name of the album is taken from the band's flagship dance at the time, the zekete zekete.

D.V. Moanda died on January 10, 1984, at age 36. Until 1987, an annual concert was played in tribute to the founder of the band. Still in early 1984, the singer Likinga Redo was arrested in Grandola for drug possession. After mourning Moanda, a promoter from Gabon, Gustave Bongo (said to be related to Omar Bongo), proposed to the administrators of the band to sponsor the band. Singer Dindo Yogo also joined the band in the same year.

Their tenth album named "On Gagne le Procès" was released in June 1984. It was issued on CD in 1992 by Sonodisc as "L'Authéntique Zaïko Langa Langa". The next album, entitled "Le Tout Choc Zaïko Langa Langa en Europe", was also published in 1984. During European tours of the band, albums were recorded in Europe, precisely in Brussels.

The next year, another two LPs were released, including "Zaïko Eyi Nkisi", which included the third version of "Etape", as well as Dindo Yogo's hit, "Mokili Échanger", retracing the musical career of the latter and also a little part of Zaire's political history. Bongo bought Zaïko's headquarter, the Ma Elika Bar, reformed and renamed it N'Goss Club. They were finalists in the Prix Découvertes RFI in 1986 as "second Afro-Caribbean group behind Kassav".

In October 1986, Zaïko Langa Langa traveled to Japan to perform shows in universities around Tokyo, as part of a festival, as well as many concerts in Osaka and Sapporo. The tour was named Nippon Banzai. The name was also used for the band's sixteenth LP of the same title, a medley of Zaïko's older songs. It remains one of the most classic Congolese albums.

Subissez les Conséquences and 1988 major split 
In December 1987, the group's eighteenth album was released, entitled "Subissez Les Conséquences". A two-day concert in the Palais du Peuple also took place in the same month to celebrate the group's 18th anniversary with guests such as Papa Wemba, Evoloko Jocker, Mavuela Somo and Félix Manuaku Waku.

At this time, tensions were high within the orchestra, due to leadership issues, salary and unpaid royalties. On May 6, 1988, more than 11 members of the band left, including Ilo Pablo, Bimi Ombale and Lengi Lenga, who also were the headliners of a new group. Zaïko Langa Langa Familia Dei was born. Likinga, who served his sentence in Portugal, joined the group for a short period. A quarrel between Zaïko Langa Langa Nkolo Mboka and Zaïko Langa Langa Familia Dei was triggered after this split. The war was also notable in the early records of both factions after the split.

Zaïko Langa Langa released their nineteenth LP entitled "Jetez l'Éponge" in December 1989, a medley to introduce the new members of the band.

1990–1999: "Ici ça va…Fungola Motema" to "Poison" 
In 1990, Zaïko Langa Langa became the headliner of concerts in French halls, including the Maison de la Mutualité. During the tour they recorded their twentieth album "Ici ça va…Fungola Motema" containing 6 songs including "Exil" composed by Adamo Ekula. The song was acclaimed Best song of Year 1991.

The following year, 1991, they prepared their next album "Jamais Sans Nous". The album had included the hit "Dede" composed by Jossart N'Yoka Longo. They then begin another tour between Paris, Belgium and Switzerland with performances notably at La Madeleine.

After the tour, they stay in Kinshasa for 3 years and prepare N'Yoka Longo's first solo album, Avis de Recherche. At the same time, they performed many concerts, notably a "fara-fara" (duel concerts) against Wenge Musica in the Intercontinental Hotel of Kinshasa, which they won, and also a two-day reunion concert of the Langa Langa clan on 15–16 November 1993 with Papa Wemba and the members who had previously left to create Zaïko Langa Langa Familia Dei. Apart from those concerts, they also performed concerts around East Africa.

In early 1995, after arriving in Paris to record their next album, they played a "concert-duel" with Pépé Kallé. Eventually, on May 31, 1995, Zaïko Langa Langa's twenty-second album "Avis de Recherche" was released. The album receives a great success which allows the group to emerge another European tour of a year and a half.

Upon their return to Kinshasa, the group obtained contracts with Castel Beer in 1997. They also recruited young musicians to rejuvenate their lineup. Their new album, Nous y Sommes, released on October 2, 1998, was recorded at a popular local studio in Kinshasa, N'Diaye, which also produced the record.

The ensemble arrived in Paris in 1999, they performed at the Cannes Film Festival in May, then they recorded the album Poison released towards the end of 1999.

Shortly before the recording of the album, three major members of the group, Meridjo Belobi, Oncle Bapius and Modikilo Modeste, left the band to form Zaïko Langa Langa Universel. Apart from a tour in Paris, the ensemble also performed in the Benelux.

The same year, a documentary on the band was made and released by Yves Billon "Zaïko Langa Langa, le goût du travail bien fait".

2002–2009: Zenith concert and Brussels headquarters 
In 2002, Zaïko Langa Langa performed in the mythic arena Zenith Paris. More than 6,000 fans attended and considered it as the renaissance or rebirth of Zaïko. As early as 1988, Zaïko, being very popular at that time, made plan to perform in Zenith but the great split that occurred in the band stopped it for doing so.

Zaïko spent 6  years in Europe (2002–09). They became based in Brussels, Belgium but still toured around Europe. During that time, they released three studio albums: "Euréka !", "Empreinte", "Rencontres". The latter featured former members of Zaïko Langa Langa and associated acts of the band including Tony Dee.

2010–2018: Successful comeback 
In 2009, the group returned to Kinshasa. The group suffered another dislocation. The majority of the members remained in Europe. After coming back with only 8 musicians, they had a reserve team called Les Ganers, which has become the main team until now.

On August 6, 2011, they released the album Bande Annonce. Due to its great popularity, on August 24, 2011, the popular dance, Mukongo ya koba (in French: the back of the turtle), was awarded "Best Dance" at the ninth edition of the Muana Mboka trophy, celebrated in Large hotel in Kinshasa.

In December, the album ranked first in the 2011 hit parade, followed by Techno malewa suite and end of Werrason.

On August 2, 2014, they released the album Sisikaaaaaahh! Moto na moto na... after the popularity of their Maman Siska dance.

2019–present: 50th anniversary celebrations 
On September 7, 2019, the album Sève was released in honor of the 50th anniversary festivities of the ensemble.

After more than ten years of absence on the European stages, N'Yoka Longo and Zaïko Langa Langa perform at the Palais des Beaux-Arts in Brussels on February 29, 2020, to celebrate the band's Golden jubilee.

Starting from the late 2000s, a group of opponents of ex-president Joseph Kabila, the Combattants, have boycotted performances by Congolese artists, accused of being close to the Government. On the day of the concert, about forty of them were present outside the hall, but they failed to cancel the performance.

Musical style and development 
Zaïko Langa Langa is considered one of the most innovative and influential groups in African music.

In their debut, they begin by removing the brass instrument sections and replacing it with "cri(s)" which has become known since 1982 as animation. In 1973, they introduced the snare and hi-hat rhythm Cavacha, created by the band's drummer at the time, Meridjo Belobi, during a train journey to Pointe-Noire.

The guitar style used by the guitarists of Zaïko Langa Langa, the third and other generations of Congolese music was a concept of Manuaku Waku, the band's first soloist. He claimed to have revolutionized Congolese music by creating the third school apart from those of Nico Kasanda and Franco.

Bassist Oncle Bapius, for his part, created his style of bass (which he called Kindobika or trombone) which was also heavily used by other musicians. He claimed to have created this style by mixing Kintueni (neo-traditional music of the Yombe tribe) and sounds he listened to when he was a boy scout.

Influences 
Zaïko Langa Langa's early influences include Tabu Ley Rochereau and Los Nickelos. The band's early songs undoubtedly reflect this. This helped them later develop their own sound.

Discography

Albums

Non Stop Dancing (1974)
Plaisir de l'Ouest Afrique (double album, 1976)
Gitta Production présente le Tout-Choc Zaïko Langa-Langa (1981)
Tout Choc (1982)
Nkolo Mboka (double album, 1982)
La Tout Neige, Christine & Nalali Mpongui (1983)
L'Orchestre de tous les Âges (1983)
Muvaro / Etape (1983)
Zekete Zekete 2è Épisode (1983)
On Gagne le Procès (1984)
Tout-Choc Anti-Choc Zaïko Langa Langa en Europe (1984)
Zaïko Eyi Nkisi (1985)
Tala Modèle Echanger (1985)
Eh Ngoss! Eh Ngoss! Eh Ngoss! (1986)
Pusa Kuna... Serrez Serrez! (1986)
Nippon Banzai (1986)
Papa Omar (1987)
Subissez les Conséquences (1987)
Jetez l'Éponge (1989)
Ici Ça Va... Fungola Motema (1990)
Jamais Sans Nous (1991)
Avis De Recherche (1995)
Sans Issue (1996)
Backline Lesson One (1997)
Nous Y Sommes (1998)
Poison (1999)
Eureka (2002)
Empreinte (2004)
Rencontres (2007)
Bande Annonce (2011)
Sève (2019)

Contributing artist
 1994 : The Rough Guide to World Music
 2005 : Les Ténors 2 L'Afrique

References

External links
Official Zaïko Langa Langa homepage
" Zaïko Langa Langa "  1999 Documentary 52'
Africa Music Centre

Democratic Republic of the Congo musical groups